Swimming at the Friendship Games took place at the Swimming Pool at the Olimpiysky Sports Complex in Moscow, Soviet Union between 19 August and 25 August 1984. 29 events (15 men's and 14 women's) were contested.

Medal summary

Men's events

Women's events

World records broken
Five new world records were set.

Men's

Women's

Medal table

See also
 Swimming at the 1984 Summer Olympics

References

Friendship Games
Friendship Games
1984 in Soviet sport
Friendship Games
Swimming in the Soviet Union